Army General José Elito Carvalho Siqueira is a Brazilian Army general, former Chief-Minister of the Institutional Security Cabinet of the Presidency of the Republic.

Biography
Graduated as infantry Aspirant in 1969, in the Agulhas Negras Military Academy (AMAN) and has exercised numerous prominent functions, as Command of MINUSTAH and as Southern Military Commander, which he was in office between 15 August 2007 and 28 November 2008.

He was promoted to the current rank on 31 July 2007 and chosen Minister of State Chief of the Institutional Security Cabinet of the Presidency of the Republic by President-elect Dilma Rousseff on 21 December 2010.

After taking office as new Chief-Minister of the Institutional Security Cabinet, Elito stood up against the creation of a Truth Committee to investigate human rights violations during the military regime, claiming that no one should be "seeing thing from the past". Also said that "if today our children and grandchildren study in a school, the 31 March will be there as a historical fact. We should see the 31 March as a historical data for the nation, with pros and cons, mas as a historical data. The same way the disappeared ones".

In an interview, said that the existence of political disappeared is not a shame for the country. Dilma Rousseff, who was tortured during the regime, reprimanded the general, that apologized, alleging that he was misunderstood in his press statements.

On 2 December 2015, in Dilma's ministry reform, Siqueira was fired and the Security Cabinet was merged to the Secretariat of Government, created in that day and assumed by Ricardo Berzoini.

References

United Nations military personnel
Brazilian generals
Living people
1946 births
People from Aracaju
20th-century Brazilian military personnel
21st-century Brazilian military personnel
Government ministers of Brazil